Maria Mourani (born May 19, 1969) is a Canadian politician who was elected as a Member of Parliament in the federal riding of Ahuntsic in Canada. She was formerly a member of the Bloc Québécois before leaving the party over its support for the proposed Quebec Charter of Values. She joined the New Democratic Party in November 2014 but was not a member of the party's caucus due to the party's policy against crossing the floor; she stood for the NDP in the 2015 Canadian federal election, but did not win. Mourani was the first woman of Lebanese origin elected to the Canadian House of Commons. In 2017, she became the Quebec representative in the Permanent Delegation of Canada at UNESCO.

Before politics
Mourani was born in Abidjan, Ivory Coast. Of Lebanese descent, Mourani immigrated to Canada in 1988. She has held positions as rehabilitation consultant, professor, researcher, and parole officer. She is a former parole officer for Correctional Service of Canada. She is a former member of the Saint-Laurent volunteer action, Henri-Beaulieu school establishment council, Founoun artistic journal, Quebec Association of Criminologists, and the Reflection Committee and Social Action. She is the former President of the Bloc's citizen's committee and on the Parti Québécois riding executive in the provincial riding of Acadie and the Committee director of the PQ orientation congress. She was also a freelance writer for L'Avenir.

Maria Mourani is also the author of La face cachée des gangs de rue (October 2006), a book about street gangs in Montreal. She followed it up with a second book on street gang networks in Canada, United States and Central America entitled Gangs de rue inc. (September 2009).

She was a co-founder and a co-president of the Canadian Lebanese Friendship Association in the Canadian Parliament as well as the President of the Algerian Canadian Friendship Association.

On 15 August 2008, she was awarded an honorary medal in Beirut, Lebanon by the World Lebanese Cultural Union (WLCU).

Political career
In the 2003 Quebec election, she ran unsuccessfully as the PQ candidate in Acadie.

She was elected in the 2006 Canadian federal election and reelected in 2008 and 2011. She was consequently assigned as the Bloc Québécois Critic on Public Security and on the Status of Women in the Canadian Parliament.

After the 2011 federal election Mourani was one of only four Bloc Québécois MPs left in the House of Commons, the only Bloc member from the Montreal area, and the only female Bloc MP in the 41st Parliament.

She declared her candidacy in the Bloc Québécois leadership election that was held to choose a successor to Gilles Duceppe and ran on a platform of making the Bloc more independent from the Parti Québécois. She was defeated on the second ballot by former MP Daniel Paillé on December 11, 2011.

She was expelled from the Bloc Quebecois caucus on September 12, 2013, for opposing the Quebec Charter of Values and subsequently sat as an independent for the remainder of her term as MP.

On December 18, 2013, Mourani surprised citizens by announcing that she had renounced sovereigntism. She now believed that Canadian federalism was the best way to protect minority rights, and argued that the Charter of Rights and Freedoms was best suited to protect "the Quebec identity and all citizens of Quebec." She also accused the PQ of running its election campaign "on the backs of believers."

On November 19, 2014, Mourani announced that she would run for the NDP in the next election, though as per the party's policy on crossing the floor she remained an independent MP until the election.

On January 21, 2015 she was acclaimed the NDP's candidate in the renamed Ahuntsic-Cartierville for the 2015 Canadian federal election,  but lost her seat to rival Liberal candidate Mélanie Joly.

After the 2015 elections, she opened a consultancy office Mourani-Criminologie on criminology with a concentration on issues of organized crime and gangs, juvenile delinquency, human trafficking, prostitution and international terrorism. She is a member of the Quebec Professional Order of Criminologists.

On 25 October 2017, the Quebec government nominated Mourani as the Quebec representative in the Permanent Delegation of Canada at the United Nations Educational, Scientific and Cultural Organization (UNESCO) in Paris replacing Julie Miville-Dechêne. She assumes her position starting 5 December 2017.

Bibliography
Books
 La face cachée des gangs de rue, Les Éditions de l'Homme, 2006, 211 pages 
 Gangs de rue inc. : leurs réseaux au Canada et dans les Amériques,  Les éditions de l'Homme, 2009, 416 pages, 

Others
Rose Dufour, Ina Motoi (preface by Maria Mourani and Hélène Manseau), La femme, sa sexualité et son pouvoir sexuel: programme d'appropriation de sa sexualité, Les Presses de l'Université du Québec, 2011
Notre indépendance: 28 Québécois s'expriment (collective book), under the direction of Catherine Fillion-Lauzièr, Stanké, 2012

Electoral record

|-

|-

|-

| style="text-align:left;" colspan="2"|Liberal hold
|align="right"|Swing
|align="right"| -9.6
|align="right"|

References

External links
 Official site
 

1969 births
Living people
Bloc Québécois MPs
Canadian Maronites
Women members of the House of Commons of Canada
Independent MPs in the Canadian House of Commons
Ivorian emigrants to Canada
Members of the House of Commons of Canada from Quebec
New Democratic Party candidates for the Canadian House of Commons
People from Abidjan
Probation and parole officers
Women in Quebec politics
21st-century Canadian politicians
21st-century Canadian women politicians
Canadian politicians of Lebanese descent
Politicians affected by a party expulsion process